Tommy Paul was the defending champion but chose not to defend his title.

Zachary Svajda won the title after defeating Ben Shelton 2–6, 6–2, 6–4 in the final.

Seeds

Draw

Finals

Top half

Bottom half

References

External links
Main draw
Qualifying draw

Tiburon Challenger - 1
2022 Singles